Manuel de Jesús María Ulpiano Troncoso de la Concha (April 3, 1878 – May 30, 1955) was an intellectual and President of the Dominican Republic from 1940 until 1942. Prior to ascending to the Presidency, he was Vice-President from 1938 to 1940. His term began upon the death of President Jacinto Peynado. He also served in 1911 during the reign of the Council of Secretaries.

Early life and education
Troncoso was the son of Jesús María Uladislao Troncoso Troncoso (1855–1923), treasurer and sacristan of the Basilica Cathedral of Santa María la Menor, and Baldomera de la Concha Silva (1844–1923). Manuel was educated at the Conciliar Seminary of St. Thomas Aquinas, graduating with a Bachelor of Philosophy and Letters degree on November 25, 1895. He also was educated in the law, graduating from Professional Institute on April 3, 1899.

Professional life
Troncoso founded the commercial and civil law firm Oficina Troncoso in 1915 in Santo Domingo. He served as a judge in the First Instance, Court of Appeal, and Land Court. He served on the Supreme Court and as Minister of Justice, Minister of Public Instruction, Minister of Industry and Commerce, Minister of Communications, Minister of the Interior, and Attorney General, and Minister of Finance from 1944 to 1945. He was also founding member of the Dominican Academy of History and Chairman of its Board from 1944 until 1955.

Troncoso was Mayor of Santo Domingo as well as President of The National Electoral Board. He was attorney for the International Court and was a professor and Dean of the Law School and Principal of the Autonomous University of Santo Domingo. He served as Vice-President of the Republic from 1938 until 1940. After serving as President, Troncoso became President of the Senate from 1943 to 1955. He was coroner of the Judicial District of Santo Domingo from 1911 until the time of his death.

As an author, Troncoso published Elementos de Derecho Administrativo (lit. "Elements of Administrative Law"), Narraciones Dominicanas (lit. "Dominican Narratives"), La Ocupación de Santo Domingo por Haití (lit. "The Occupation of Santo Domingo by Haiti"), El Brigadier Juan Sánchez Ramírez (lit. "Brigadier Juan Sánchez Ramírez"), and Génesis de la Convención Dominico-Americana (lit. "Genesis of the Dominican-American Convention"). He was Editor-in-chief of Listín Diario from 1899 to 1911.

As president
On May 17, 1942 Troncoso appointed Generalissimo Rafael Trujillo as the new Secretary of War and Secretary of the Navy, using the previous resignation of Héctor Trujillo as a legal basis.

Private life 
Troncoso married to Silvia Alicia Sánchez Abreu (1882–?), who became the first Dominican electress to ballot her vote on 16 May 1942 after women's suffrage was approved earlier that year. Troncoso and Sánchez had 6 children: Jesús María (1902–1982), who married María Ramírez García and had 1 child, Manuel Troncoso Ramírez (1927–2012); Pedro (1904–1989), who married Olga Hilda Lopez-Penha Alfau and had 2 children; Isabel Genoveva (1906–1991), who married Marino Emilio Cáceres Ureña and had 3 children including Ramón Cáceres Troncoso (b. 1930); Wenceslao (1907–2008), who married Rosa Mercedes Barrera Vega and had 4 children; and Altagracia (1915–1989), who married Eduardo Morales Avelino and had 5 children including Carlos Morales Troncoso (1940–2014).

His sons Jesús María and Wenceslao were, respectively, the first and second governor of the Central Bank of the Dominican Republic; in addition, both of them and their brother Pedro were all prominent lawyers and jurists in the Dominican Republic. Wenceslao was deputy, senator, and ambassador, as well, while Pedro was Chief Justice of the Supreme Court (1946–1949).

Ancestry

References

1878 births
1955 deaths
Vice presidents of the Dominican Republic
Presidents of the Dominican Republic
Presidents of the Senate of the Dominican Republic
Commerce ministers of the Dominican Republic
Communication ministers of the Dominican Republic
Finance ministers of the Dominican Republic
Industry ministers of the Dominican Republic
Interior ministers of the Dominican Republic
Justice ministers of the Dominican Republic
Attorneys General of the Republic (Dominican Republic)
Dominican Party politicians
Dominican Republic people of Spanish descent
20th-century Dominican Republic politicians